is a 2-part 2015 Japanese suspense mystery film directed by Izuru Narushima, based on the novel of the same title by Miyuki Miyabe. The first, was released on March 7 and the second, was released on April 11, 2015.

Cast
Ryōko Fujino as Ryōko Fujino
Mizuki Itagaki
Anna Ishii
Hiroya Shimizu
Miu Tomita
Kōki Maeda  (Maeda Maeda's older brother)
Haru Kuroki
Machiko Ono
Hiromi Nagasaku
Kuranosuke Sasaki
Yui Natsukawa
Fumiyo Kohinata

Reception
Part 1 earned  on its opening weekend in Japan.

Derek Elley of Film Business Asia gave both films an 8 out of 10, saying that the first "fans out in involving ways" and that the second "wraps in a challenging and satisfying way." The films won the 2015 Hochi Film Award for Best Picture.

References

External links
 

2010s mystery films
Films directed by Izuru Narushima
Japanese mystery films
Shochiku films
2010s Japanese films